Baudinella is a genus of air-breathing land snails, terrestrial pulmonate gastropod mollusks in the family Camaenidae.

Species
Species within the genus Baudinella include:

 Baudinella baudinensis A. Smith, 1893

References

 Nomenclator Zoologicus info

 
Camaenidae
Taxonomy articles created by Polbot